Progressive conservatism is a political ideology which combines conservative and progressive policies. The initial origins of progressivism come from Western Europe during the 18th century and the Age of Enlightenment when it was believed that social reform and progression in areas such as science, economics, education, technology and medicine were necessary to improve human living conditions.

British Prime Minister William Pitt the Younger, a Tory, campaigned for the abolition of slavery. The Slave Trade Act of 1807 was passed a year after his death. During the 19th century, British Prime Minister Benjamin Disraeli helped to intellectually define that form of conservative politics under his one-nation conservative government. Witnessing the negative impacts current working conditions had on people during the time, mainly brought about by the Industrial Revolution, Disraeli started to believe that changes to society were needed to improve human and environmental conditions. However, this progression needed to be done through conservative thinking and policies, namely that the government can do good and should get involved, but only when it is necessary and within its own means, being a limited but obligatory government. The idea advocates that a social safety net is required, but only in a minimal form. Christian democracy and Catholic social teaching promotes some form of progressive conservatism, derived from the text of Rerum novarum. Progressive conservatives also believe instant change is not always the best and can sometimes be damaging to society, therefore cautious change that fits in with the nation's social and political traditions is necessary.

In the United States, Theodore Roosevelt has been the main figure identified with progressive conservatism as a political tradition. Roosevelt stated that he had "always believed that wise progressivism and wise conservatism go hand in hand". In Britain, one-nation conservatives such as David Cameron who launched the Progressive Conservatism Project in 2009 and Theresa May have described themselves as progressive conservatives. Other European leaders such as Angela Merkel have been aligning themselves with progressive conservative politics.

See also 
 Bright Blue
 Christian democracy
 Conservative liberalism
 Green conservatism
 Compassionate conservatism
 Konrad Adenauer Foundation
 Liberal conservatism
 Neoclassical liberalism
 One-nation conservatism
 Paternalistic conservatism
 Progressive Conservative Party of Canada
 Radical centrism
 Red Tory
 Social market economy
 Tory Reform Group
 Bull Moose Party

References 

Conservatism
Christian democracy
Centre-right politics
Political ideologies
Progressivism
Right-wing ideologies